is a former Nippon Professional Baseball pitcher.

He is known for being the namesake of former Major League Baseball pitcher Daisuke Matsuzaka.

References

External links

1964 births
Living people
Baseball people from Tokyo
Japanese baseball players
Nippon Professional Baseball pitchers
Yakult Swallows players
Yokohama BayStars players
Japanese baseball coaches
Nippon Professional Baseball coaches